Antwan Afram (born 1 January 1998), known professionally as Ant Wan, is a Swedish rapper of Assyrian descent from Västerås. He started rapping in Råby and released his first songs in early 2016. His songs gained popularity in late 2016. He made a few songs in 2017 and later in 2018 changed his artist name to Ant Wan. His five-track EP Wow, which included the tracks "Wow", "Kall", "Rikare", "Fendi" and "Boo", reached the top of the Swedish Albums Chart.

In December 2019, Ant Wan founded his own record label, Bando Kids Music. It had signed the rappers Christian "10an" Homsi and 2M, but was closed down in March 2021 after the two signed artists were arrested and later convicted of serious crimes.

Discography

Studio albums

Extended plays

Singles

As lead artist

Featured singles

Other charted songs

Notes

References

External links
 Ant Wan at AllMusic
 
 

Swedish rappers
Living people
1998 births